Avvo.com is an online marketplace for legal services, that provides lawyer referrals and access to a database of legal information consisting primarily of previously answered questions. Lawyer profiles may include client reviews, disciplinary actions, peer endorsements, and lawyer-submitted legal guides.

History
Avvo was founded in Seattle, Washington in 2006 by Mark Britton, a former legal counsel for Expedia, Inc. and Paul Bloom. Britton said he developed the idea while vacationing in Italy and was still receiving inquires from friends and colleagues seeking legal advice. Rich Barton, the founder of the Expedia, Inc. and real-estate database Zillow.com, was a key advisor during the initial ideation stages and still serves on the board of directors. Avvo was derived from “avvocato”, the Italian word for lawyer.

The company was initially financed with $13 million in venture capital from Benchmark Capital and Ignition Partners. Subsequently, Avvo raised $71.5 million in financing in 2015, which brings the company's total financing to $132 million.

In January 2018, Avvo entered a deal to be acquired by Internet Brands.

Business model
Avvo generates revenue by selling legal services, advertising, and other services primarily to lawyers. Avvo operates as a scraper site to generate its lawyer listing pages causing the District of Columbia Bar Association to specifically object to its business practices. An additional source of revenue for Avvo is through a subscription service called which allows lawyers to remove advertisements from their profile, including advertisements by competing lawyers which may appear on non-advertising lawyer profiles.

Lawyer directory
According to the website, the directory provides comprehensive profiles, client reviews, peer endorsements, and its own proprietary rating for more than 97% of all licensed attorneys in the United States. Avvo lawyer profiles are aggregated from public records provided by state bars and additional attorney licensing entities. Avvo will not delete any lawyer's profile, and has been criticized for including profiles of deceased lawyers.

As of 2010, Avvo's directory includes ratings of lawyers in all 50 states and the District of Columbia. The District of Columbia Bar Association released its position about Avvo:

The Bar has not entered into any agreement with Avvo; instead, Avvo has obtained Bar member information directly from the Bar’s Web site, in violation of our restrictions on use, and used that information for its own commercial purposes. The Bar has asked Avvo to remove all improperly acquired D.C. Bar member information from its Web site, cease all attempts to acquire such information from the Bar’s Web site, and cease using improperly acquired information for any commercial purpose.

Lawyer ratings
Avvo presents ratings of lawyers that are included in its directory, based upon a proprietary algorithm. Avvo cautions users that a rating "is not an endorsement of any particular lawyer, and is not a guarantee of a lawyer's quality, competency, or character. Nor is the Avvo Rating a predictor of the outcome of any matter in which such lawyer is involved."

Avvo's rating system has been criticized and has inspired some controversy. When sued by lawyers who object to the ratings, Avvo has successfully defended against the lawsuits by asserting that the ratings constitute a constitutionally protected opinion.

Browne v. Avvo
A lawsuit was filed on June 14, 2007, nine days after Avvo's launch, by Seattle attorneys, John Henry Browne and Alan Wenokur. The suit alleged that Avvo's rating system made false claims of being factual and was therefore deceptive and libelous and violated the Washington Consumer Protection Act.
United States District Court Judge Robert Lasnik ruled that the rating system was only an opinion and was thus protected by the First Amendment right of free speech. The judge wrote, "Neither the nature of the information provided nor the language used on the Web site would lead a reasonable person to believe that the ratings are a statement of actual fact."

After the ruling, an editorial in The Wall Street Journal endorsed the website for providing "at least some measure of transparency" of the legal profession.

New Jersey 
The New Jersey State Bar Association sent an inquiry to the Advisory Committee on Professional Ethics asking if New Jersey attorneys may participate in certain online, non-lawyer, corporately owned services specifically naming Avvo and other online services. As a result of that inquiry, the Advisory Committee on Professional Ethics, Committee on Attorney Advertising, and Committee on the Unauthorized Practice of Law issued a joint opinion. The joint opinion stated that New Jersey attorneys may not participate in Avvo Legal services as it is against the rule of professional conduct.

Doctor directory
The doctor directory launched on November 1, 2010. Avvo's health business was sold to HealthTap on November 29, 2012.

Security incidents
In 2022 evidence appeared that Avvo.com had suffered a breach, exposing the email addresses of 4 million accounts.

References

External links
 
 Browne et al. v. Avvo Inc et al. (W.D. Wash. 2007) decision, legal briefs and other court documents & filings
 5 Reasons Lawyers Hate Avvo - Criticisms of Avvo by Attorneys - By William Pfeifer - November 25, 2014

Internet properties established in 2007
Online legal services
Online marketplaces of the United States
Question-and-answer websites